The ATP Tour is a worldwide top-tier tennis tour for men organized by the Association of Tennis Professionals. The second-tier tour is the ATP Challenger Tour and the third-tier is the ITF Men's World Tennis Tour. The equivalent women's organisation is the WTA Tour.

ATP Tour tournaments
The ATP Tour comprises ATP Masters 1000, ATP 500, and ATP 250 and the ATP Cup. The ATP also oversees the ATP Challenger Tour, a level below the ATP Tour, and the ATP Champions Tour for seniors. The Grand Slam tournaments, the Olympic tennis tournament, the Davis Cup, and the entry-level ITF World Tennis Tour do not fall under the purview of the ATP, but are overseen by the International Tennis Federation (ITF) instead and the International Olympic Committee (IOC) for the Olympics. In these events, however, ATP ranking points are awarded, with the exception of the Olympics. Players and doubles teams with the most ranking points (collected during the calendar year) play in the season-ending ATP Finals, which, from 2000–2008, was run jointly with the ITF. The details of the professional tennis tour are:

ATP rankings

ATP publishes weekly rankings of professional players.

Current rankings

Records

See also
 ATP Challenger Tour
 ITF Men's World Tennis Tour
 WTA Tour
 Grand Prix tennis circuit
 World Championship Tennis
 Tennis Pro Tours

References

External links

 
Tennis tours and series
Association of Tennis Professionals
Recurring sporting events established in 1990
Men's tennis tournaments